Dimitri Dmitrievich Venediktov was the Deputy Health Minister of the USSR from 1965 to 1981 under Ministers of Health Boris Petrovsky and Sergei Burenkov. In this role, he was instrumental in the campaign to eradicate smallpox and supplying vaccines for the program  He was also involved in organizing the Conference of Alma-Ata which was foundational in the field of public health. He was elected to the Congress of People's Deputies of the Soviet Union from 1989 to its dissolution. He currently serves on the Russian Academy of Medical Sciences, focusing on information storage in healthcare.

Awards 
Venediktov received two Orders of the Red Banner of Labour and one Order of the Badge of Honour amongst other awards.

References 

Living people
Soviet public health doctors
Full Members of the USSR Academy of Sciences
Full Members of the Russian Academy of Sciences
Academicians of the Russian Academy of Medical Sciences
Smallpox eradication
Academicians of the USSR Academy of Medical Sciences
1929 births